Pinecrest is a suburban village in Miami-Dade County, Florida, United States. As of the 2020 census the population was 18,388.

Pinecrest is governed by a five-member village council and operates under the council-manager form of government. 33156, the ZIP code that encompasses most of the village, has been consistently ranked as one of the most expensive in the United States.

History
During the 1900s, Miami pioneer and railroad tycoon Henry Flagler used the property at U.S. 1 and Southwest 102 Street as a staging area during the construction of the Overseas Railroad to the Florida Keys.

In the 1930s, the area's growth continued and the community began to evolve around one of the first tourist attractions established in the Miami vicinity – Parrot Jungle and Gardens.  Parrot Jungle was founded in 1936 by Franz and Louise Scherr on property located at Red Road and Southwest 111 Street and over the years has become a tourist attraction whose visitors included Winston Churchill. The idea for Parrot Jungle began after Scherr, who owned and operated a feed and supply store in Homestead, and became intrigued with the idea of building an attraction where birds would "fly free". To bring his vision to life, he rented  of hammock land for an annual fee of $25 (equivalent to $476.92 in 2021). Parrot Jungle was built as a winding nature trail dug through the coral rock and hammock land, indigenous to the area. All the natural plants were left undisturbed. The entrance was built on Red Road. The attraction opened on December 20, 1936, to about 100 visitors. Each paid 25 cents admission to see and hear Scherr talk about his birds, trees and flowers. Since 1936, Parrot Jungle has attracted over a million visitors. On December 17, 2002, the Village of Pinecrest purchased the Parrot Jungle with the aim of developing the site as Pinecrest Gardens. On March 8, 2003, the Pinecrest Village Council dedicated Pinecrest Gardens and officially opened it to the public as the village's newest municipal park. The attraction moved to a new waterfront location on Watson Island between downtown Miami and Miami Beach. It was relaunched as Parrot Jungle Island.

The Miami Serpentarium, a tourist attraction that featured snakes, lizards and other reptiles and amphibians, was located on US 1 for many decades prior to closing in the mid-1980s.

During the 1950s and 1960s, the area flourished with the development and construction of ranch-style houses on  lots which laid the foundation for the community's rural and lushly landscaped residential character.

While still an unincorporated area of Miami-Dade County, what is now Pinecrest was the site of the 1986 FBI Miami shootout. The shootout took place near 12201 Southwest 82nd Avenue.

In August 1992, Pinecrest and the surrounding South Miami-Dade area were devastated by the effects of Hurricane Andrew. Many of the homes and businesses in the area were destroyed. In the subsequent years, the area was slowly rebuilt.

Rapid growth and local issues during the 1990s inspired a movement led by residents Evelyn Greer Langlieb and Gary C. Matzner to incorporate the area. The Village of Pinecrest was officially incorporated on March 12, 1996. Evelyn Greer was elected the first mayor and was succeeded, after serving two terms, by Matzner in 2004. The founding village council, including Greer, Cindie Blanck, Barry Blaxberg, Leslie Bowe, Robert Hingston, together with Village Manager Peter G. Lombardi and Village Clerk Guido Inguanzo, are credited with establishing well-regarded municipal services including police, parks and recreation, building and planning services, and public works.

Geography
U.S. Route 1 (Pinecrest Parkway) forms the western border of the village. Neighboring communities are Coral Gables to the east, South Miami to the north, Glenvar Heights to the northwest, Kendall to the west, and Palmetto Bay to the south.

Demographics

2020 census

As of the 2020 United States census, there were 18,388 people, 6,033 households, and 4,936 families residing in the village.

2010 census

As of 2010, there were 6,619 households, out of which 6.4% were vacant. In 2000, 47.6% had children under the age of 18 living with them, 70% were married couples living together, 8.7% had a female householder with no husband present, and 19% were non-families. 15.1% of all households were made up of individuals, and 4.9% had someone living alone who was 65 years of age or older.  The average household size was 3.04 and the average family size was 3.39.

2000 census
In 2000, the village population was spread out, with 31.4% under the age of 18, 5.6% from 18 to 24, 27.2% from 25 to 44, 25.5% from 45 to 64, and 10.2% who were 65 years of age or older. The median age was 38 years. For every 100 females, there were 93.3 males. For every 100 females age 18 and over, there were 89.4 males.

In 2000, the median income for a household in the village was $105,557, and the median income for a family was $122,526. Males had a median income of $88,091 versus $35,806 for females. The per capita income for the village was $56,723.  About 2.4% of families and 4.2% of the population were below the poverty line, including 3.3% of those under age 18 and 3.5% of those age 65 or over.

As of 2000, speakers of English as a first language accounted for 58.09%, while Spanish made up 35.08%, French and Portuguese were tied at 1.91%, Chinese speakers were at 1.67%, Arabic at 0.89%, and German as a mother tongue consisted of 0.46% of the population.

Government and infrastructure
Miami-Dade Fire Rescue operates Station 49 Pinecrest.

Community projects

Pinecrest's projects since 1996 include the addition of several new parks, development of Wi-Fi technology and beautification projects which included thousands of trees being planted, unique street signs being posted village-wide, and roads being repaved. By planting over 10,000 street trees since 1997, Pinecrest was named a Tree City USA community by the Arbor Day Foundation.

In 2008, the village council dedicated the new Flagler Grove Park and the long-awaited community center at Pinecrest Gardens.  The Pinecrest branch of the Miami-Dade County Library System opened adjacent to the community center in October 2008.

Parks 
There are five public parks managed by the Pinecrest Parks and Recreation Department:
 Coral Pine Park — A  park with a recreation center, six lighted tennis courts, a natural area, an all-purpose field and a tot lot. Coral Pine Park was a former Miami-Dade County park before being transferred to Pinecrest in 1998.
 Flagler Grove Park — A  facility with lighted youth soccer fields, a playground, parking and restrooms. As mentioned above, the park was dedicated in 2008. 
 Evelyn Greer Park — A  park with multipurpose athletic fields, batting cages, a tot lot, and a recreation center and community gazebo with a Wi-Fi spot. Formerly known as Pinecrest Park, it was re-designated on November 9, 2004 in recognition of Pinecrest's first mayor. 
 Suniland Park — A  park with baseball and football fields, batting cages, a recreation center, basketball courts, a tot lot and a gazebo with a Wi-Fi spot. 
 Veterans Wayside Park — A  park with a freshwater lake and open recreation areas.

Pinecrest Gardens 
Pinecrest Gardens has been described as the "crown jewel" of the village's park system. Known as South Florida's Cultural Arts Park, it is a large park featuring over 1,000 varieties of exotic tropical plants and trees. The park landscape features natural streams, sinkholes, caves and fissures. The park also offers various programs including summer camps, and is located on the former site of the Parrot Jungle.

Transportation
Pinecrest is served by Metrobus throughout the area and by Miami Metrorail at the following stations:

  Dadeland North (SW 70th Avenue and U.S. 1)
  Dadeland South (Dadeland Boulevard and U.S. 1)

Education
Pinecrest is served by the Miami-Dade County Public Schools system.

Public elementary schools
 Pinecrest Elementary School – Opened in 1954
 Palmetto Elementary School
 Howard Drive Elementary School (Palmetto Bay)

Public middle schools
 Palmetto Middle School

Public high schools
 Miami Palmetto High School

Private schools:
 Bet Shira Congregation
 Gulliver Preparatory
 Kendall United Methodist
 Pinecrest Presbyterian
 St. Louis Covenant School
 Temple Beth Am

The Miami-Dade Public Library System operates the Pinecrest Branch.

Miami Hoshuko, a weekend school for Japanese citizens, previously held classes at the Kendall United Methodist Church, now in Pinecrest but formerly in the Kendall census-designated place as of 1990.

Media 
The Village of Pinecrest has its own newspaper, The Pinecrest Tribune, which is published bi-weekly and is part of Miami Community Newspapers. The village of Pinecrest is also served by the Miami market for local radio and television.

References

External links

 
 Palmetto Middle School

Villages in Miami-Dade County, Florida
Villages in Florida
1996 establishments in Florida
Populated places established in 1996